The Miseryfjellet Formation is a geologic formation in Norway. It preserves fossils dating back to the Permian period.

See also

 List of fossiliferous stratigraphic units in Norway

References
 

Permian Norway
Permian northern paleotemperate deposits